Janette Williamson (born 1965), is a British Labour politician and current Leader of Wirral Council. She is the first woman to lead the Council in 29 years.

She was elected leader of the Labour group on Wirral Council on 29 June 2020, beating fellow councillors Gillian Wood and Yvonne Nolan. Nolan was last woman to lead the Council between 1990 and 1991.

Williamson became Leader of the Council in a virtual meeting on 28 September with the Council governing under a Committee system.

References

|-

|-

1965 births
Living people
Members of Wirral Council
Labour Party (UK) councillors
Leaders of local authorities of England
Women councillors in England